Corydoras narcissus is a tropical freshwater fish belonging to the Corydoradinae sub-family of the family Callichthyidae.  It originates in inland waters in South America, and is found in the Purus River in the central Amazon Basin in Brazil. It is commonly known as the Long Nose Arched Cory. These fish are identifiable by the two dark stripes that run alongside their dorsal fins.

It lives in a tropical climate in water with a 6.0 – 8.0 pH, a water hardness of 2 – 25 dGH, and a temperature range of  – . It feeds on worms, benthic crustaceans, insects, and plant matter. It lays eggs in dense vegetation, and adults do not guard the eggs. Unlike most other Corydoras, this fish can be aggressive towards other of its species.

The species was first collected by Herbert R. Axelrod and Martin R. Brittan. It was first described and named narcissus by Han Nijssen and Isaäc J. H. Isbrücker to recognize the collectors "for their many naming suggestions".

See also
 List of freshwater aquarium fish species

References

External links
 Photos at Fishbase
 

Corydoras
Fish described in 1980